The 2000 Purefoods Tender Juicy Hotdogs season was the 13th season of the franchise in the Philippine Basketball Association (PBA).

Draft picks

Transactions

Finals stint
Purefoods return to the PBA finals after two years of non-title playoff. In the All-Filipino Cup, the Tender Juicy Hotdogs got the benefit of playing in the championship when the league forfeited Tanduay Rhum's two wins over them during the Best-of-five semifinal series where Fil-Sham Sonny Alvarado was fielded in. With the series stands at 2-1 in their favor, Purefoods went on to win Game four, 72-71 in overtime, on the heroics of guard Boyet Fernandez to reach the All-Filipino finals against the Alaska Milkmen. After winning Game one of the finals series, the Tender Juicy Hotdogs lost the next four games and settled for runner-up honors.

Behind best import Derrick Brown, the Purefoods Tender Juicy Hotdogs were on their second trip to the finals in the Governors Cup. They played the defending champions San Miguel Beermen. The Hotdogs fell behind by losing the first three games of the best-of-seven title series and lost anew in five games for another runner-up finish in the season.

Roster

Elimination round

Games won

References

Magnolia Hotshots seasons
Purefoods